WUBU (106.3 FM, "Mix 106") is a radio station licensed to South Bend, Indiana, United States, and serving the South Bend market. The station is owned by Pathfinder Communications LLC.  WUBU broadcasts an Urban Adult Contemporary format.

WUBU caters to a true market niche – the African American market – in their 7-county coverage area of Northern Indiana and Lower Michigan.  Counties include:  Elkhart, LaPorte, Marshall, St. Joseph and Starke counties in Indiana, and Berrien and Cass counties in Lower Michigan.

History
WUBU originally signed on in the summer of 1991 in Kalamazoo, MI (city of license Portage), at 96.5 FM as an Adult R&B station. The station's original owner was Larry Langford, Jr., a former Chicago air personality who owned the similarly formatted WLLJ-AM 910 in Cassopolis, Michigan and continues to own that station today (now as classic hits-formatted WGTO).  Langford sold the station to Tri-State Broadcasting, Inc., in 1992; Tri-State changed the call letters to WFAT in June of that year and installed an oldies format.  The station has gone through several other call letters and formats since and is now WZOX. Larry Langford purchased a construction permit for 106.3  In South Bend Indiana and transferred the call sign WUBU to that CP as Chairman of Focus Radio

106.3 FM in South Bend began operations sometime in the early 1990s; the exact date is unknown, however, the WUBU calls and Urban AC format had surfaced on 106.3 by 1995. The current WUBU at 106.3 programmed a satellite-fed smooth jazz format for a time in the early 2000s before reverting to its previous Urban AC format.

In January 2016 WUBU-FM was purchased from Partnership Radio LLC. by Pathfinder Communications LLC, who own several stations in the Michiana Market. Pathfinder Communications LLC said that they are committed to being the area's only Urban AC station.

References

External links

UBU
Urban adult contemporary radio stations in the United States